The following Union Army units and commanders fought in the Battle of Darbytown and New Market Roads (October 7, 1864) during the Petersburg Campaign of the American Civil War. Order of battle is compiled from the official tabulation of casualties and includes only units which sustained casualties.

Military Rank Abbreviations Used
 MG = Major General
 BG = Brigadier General
 Col = Colonel
 Ltc = Lieutenant Colonel
 Maj = Major
 Cpt = Captain

Other
 w = wounded
 mw = mortally wounded
 k = killed
 c = captured

Army of the James

X Corps
MG David B. Birney

References

American Civil War orders of battle